Megachile grisescens is a species of bee in the family Megachilidae. It was described by Morawitz in 1875.

References

Grisescens
Insects described in 1875